Sobs is a Singaporean indie rock band. The band consists of Celine Autumn, Jared Lim, and Raphael Ong.

History
Sobs began in 2017, when they released their first EP titled Catflap. The trio released their first album, Telltale Signs in 2018. The trio announced their second album in October 2022 and released the album, Air Guitar, later in the same month through American based record label Topshelf Records. The album received positive reviews. The trio also announced a 2023 US tour in support of the album, beginning in February.

References

Topshelf Records artists

Singaporean rock music groups